Eva Ortiz (born January 11, 1961), better known as Eva O, is a music artist most notable for her previous works in Christian Death and a band she formed with her then-husband Rozz Williams called Shadow Project. Regarded as a veteran and "one of the most striking figures of the American Gothic scene," Eva O has had a significant influence on the emerging death rock movement, which garnered her the "Queen of Darkness" title from the press and audience. She is known for her heavy guitar playing style and dramatic, authoritative vocals.

She now releases solo albums with her band Mz O and Her Guns, as well as having recently joined a variation of Christian Death (known as Christian Death 1334) with original members and while she takes on vocal duties in place of the late Rozz Williams.

Biography
Eva was born on January 11, 1961, in Las Vegas, Nevada, and moved to Los Angeles, California, in 1979 in hopes to start a rock band and be a rock star. She started a local, all-girl punk band in Long Beach known as the Speed Queens, and played with them from 1980 to 1982.  Speed Queens broke up before they could release any songs, and she and bassist Sandra Ross started the Super Heroines. This group earned a following on L.A.'s deathrock scene of the early 1980s. About the same time, she met Rozz Williams, who was starting the band Christian Death. Eventually Eva O contributed to the band's 1982 album Only Theatre of Pain, which was a highly influential album on the emerging American deathrock movement.

The Super Heroines released several albums, and when Rikk Agnew left Christian Death, Rozz asked Eva to fill in on guitar.  She was in Christian Death for a short time before they added two more members, one of whom later played some shows with the Super Heroines.  The Super Heroines made their last album, Love and Pain, in 1983; but it was not released for another 8 years.

In the mid-1980s, Eva became involved with personal demons and a strong distaste for the world. She spent a lot of time with Richard Ramirez, with whom she claims she was in a relationship. She corresponded with him after his incarceration for a brief time, but did not meet him before his notorious killings made him famous. Ramirez committed several murders in San Francisco and stood trial there. Eventually, Eva got back together with Rozz and moved to San Francisco with him.  While there, she became interested in the writings of Anton LaVey and Boyd Rice and started to suffer from depression. Out of boredom, she and Rozz started another band known as Shadow Project; they released two albums in the 1990s with that band. They described their music as "a strange mixture of metallic death rock and punk." It was after their second album, Dreams for the Dying, that Eva and Rozz started to write even darker, more depressed and rage-filled subject matter, which was a reflection of the internal struggle they were having in their personal lives. Although Eva never considered herself to be an official member of Christian Death, her participation in that band and Shadow Project earned her the "queen of darkness" title.

Christian Death reunited and released two more albums, but the lineup that the band used on those albums was essentially just everyone from Shadow Project.  Shadow Project went on one final tour after recording a live album, In Tuned Out.

Tired of Rozz getting most of the credit for the Shadow Project work (much of which she wrote), Eva O went solo and released Past Time in 1993 on Cleopatra Records. The album featured material from her days with the Speed Queens, Super Heroines, and Christian Death, as well as three new solo songs. In 1994, she began working on her second solo album, which she was originally going to call Angels Fall for a Demon's Kiss, but after studying more about the classic hierarchy of angels on both sides of the good-vs-evil spectrum, she ended up becoming a Christian and rewriting the entire record and renaming it Demons Fall for an Angel's Kiss. Produced by Johnny Indovina, the album was tamer and calmer in comparison to her previous rugged and wild material.

Rozz Williams committed suicide on April 1, 1998; the last Shadow Project recording titled From the Heart was released on May 12 of the same year. An acoustic album, From the Heart's lyrics represented influences of Eva's positive views.

After numerous reworkings and remixings, Eva finally completed her Damnation (Ride the Madness) album in 1999 and in 2005 its follow-up Damnation/Salvation album and released it on the German death-metal label Massacre Records in 2005. Among the performers on it are Josh Pyle (keyboards/programming), River Tunnell (bass), and Kristian Rosentrater (drums), all members of the industrial band Audio Paradox. Damnation/Salvation is a detailed chronicle of her involvement with the occult and Satanism climaxing with her encounter with Jesus. It has been repeatedly turned down for distribution in the United States due to its subject matter. She emphasizes that people need to listen to the entire album to understand its full meaning, rather than judging it by its cover, track listing, and the lyrics of the first several songs.

14 years after Eva's conversion to Christianity in 1993, rumors had it that Eva began drifting away from her faith. In a Summer 2007 issue of Deathrock magazine, author Philip Henken wrote in the article "The Story of O" about Eva that "when I ask her about the Christian conversions, she tells me she's left being born-again behind." Eva states in the interview:

On August 8, 2008 (08.08.08), Eva O. married Edwin Borsheim, of the band Kettle Cadaver.

By 2014, Eve O. had returned to her faith:

Discography

Solo work as Eva O
 Past Time (1993)
 Demons Fall for an Angel's Kiss (1994, originally called Angels Fall for a Demon's Kiss but rewritten/renamed before its release)
 Eva O Halo Experience (video)
 Damnation (Ride the Madness) (1999, Massacre Records, Review: HM Magazine)
 Damnation/Salvation (2005, Massacre Records)
The Rise of Eva O (2018)

As a member of Christian Death
 Only Theatre Of Pain (1982, Frontier Records)
 Iron Mask (1992, Cleopatra)
 Path of Sorrows (1993, Cleopatra)
 Rage of Angels (1994, Cleopatra)

As a member of Super Heroines
 Cry for Help (1982, Bemis Brain/Enigma)
 Souls that Save (1983, Bemis Brain/Enigma)
 Love and Pain (1993, Cleopatra)

As a member of Shadow Project
 Shadow Project (1990, Triple X)
 Dreams for the Dying (1993, Triple X)
 In Tuned Out (1994, Triple X, live album)
 From the Heart (1998, Triple X)

See also
 Rozz Williams
 Edwin Borsheim
 Christian Death
 Shadow Project
 Super Heroines

References

External links
 
 
 Eva O's MySpace
 

Living people
1961 births
Death rock musicians
Women punk rock singers
Gothic rock musicians
American punk rock singers
Christian Death members
American musicians of Mexican descent
20th-century American women singers
20th-century American women guitarists
20th-century American guitarists
Hispanic and Latino American musicians
21st-century American women guitarists
21st-century American guitarists
21st-century American women singers
American post-punk musicians
20th-century American singers
21st-century American singers
Converts to Christianity